Adult figure skating is a term used by skating organizations to refer to tests and competitions for amateur ice skaters over 21.  The category was originally aimed at skaters who had taken up the sport as adults, but more recently has expanded to include adult skaters performing and competing at an 'elite' level (Adult Masters), many of whom had skated competitively as children or adolescents. Adults who are learning to skate without prior experience are also included. In addition, a "Young Adult" category (ages 18 – 20) has been added to many Adult events.

United States
US Figure Skating was the earliest sport governing body to codify tests and competition standards for adult skating.

Adult freeskate tests were introduced in the mid-1996s, and adult moves in the field (MITF) tests followed in 2002.

Testing
Standard track tests are open to skaters of any age, but because adults who take up skating have more limitations than young beginners, the U.S. Figure Skating introduced special tests for this category. The tests have roughly the same elements as the standard track Pre-Preliminary through Juvenile, but with a more relaxed judging standard and some moves rearranged.

There are both moves in the field and freeskate tests at the following levels:

Skaters must pass the moves in the field test before testing the corresponding freeskate test.

There is also an adult component to ice dancing and pair skating tests.

Beginning with the pre-bronze dances, adult skaters may switch to the adult track (age 21+) or masters track (age 50+).

Effective September 2, 2010, USFS has added an adult test track to Intermediate - Senior moves in the field tests.  The patterns in these tests are identical to standard tests, however, the tester is marked on a lower passing average.

Adult and masters dance tests are identical to standard tests, but do not require the tester to also perform a solo pattern of the dance, and the tester is marked on a lower passing average. Preliminary dances are tested standard track.

Adult Pairs tests are the Adult Bronze, Adult Silver and Adult Gold.

Competitions

For competitions, skaters are grouped in events by age. (The age groups may be merged depending on the number of entries). In May 2014, the age ranges in US Figure Skating were changed to the following:

Many Adult events now include a "Young Adult" category for skaters from 18 – 20 years old.

U.S. Figure Skating has four official adult competitions: Eastern, Midwestern, and Pacific Coast Sectionals, and the U.S. Adult Championships (Adult Nationals). Adult Sectionals offer qualifying events called "Championship," which are required events for skaters attempting to qualify to compete in the Championship events at Adult Nationals. The top four skaters in each Championship event qualify for the Championship event at Nationals. Other non-qualifying (open) events are also held at Sectionals. Prior to the creation of Sectionals in the late 1990s, adult skaters had their events at standard regional competitions.

The U.S. Adult Championships includes the Championship events, as well as open Adult level events (Bronze through Gold) and Masters level events (Intermediate through Senior). Along with the freeskate events, pairs, dance, solo dance, and showcase events are held. The Showcase events are split between Artistic/Dramatic and Light Entertainment for each level.  All Championship and Gold or higher events are scored using the ISU Judging System. All other events, including Showcase, are scored with the 6.0 judging system.

Skaters who have passed the standard track Intermediate freeskate or 2nd figure test must compete at the Masters level (Intermediate, Novice, Junior and Senior level skaters). Masters levels include: Masters Intermediate, Masters Novice, Masters Junior, Masters Senior, Championship Intermediate/Novice, and Championship Junior/Senior.

List of US Adult Figure Skating Championships

Several clubs host all-adult competitions throughout the skating year.  These include:

Many clubs include Adult events in their standard track competitions.

There are also some other lists that are kept of the upcoming all adult competitions

Canada

Adult skating in Canada did not have a national event until Skate Canada started the first Canadian adult championships in March 2004. The first Skate Canada Adult Championships were held in Burnaby, BC. In 2007 Calgary hosted the Championships with just over 120 competitors in ladies freeskate, men's freeskate, ladies interpretive, men's interpretive, compulsory dances, freedance and pairs.  The CPC (Cumulative Points Calculation) scoring method used is similar to the ISU system, with adjustments for STARskaters and AdultSkaters. The CPC also has a method of recording marks for interpretive programs.

Competitors do not have to qualify to enter the championship as the competition is still new and the numbers applying are not high enough to warrant preselection.

Canadian adult skaters take the same tests as juvenile StarSkaters (there are no adult tests). The levels of competition are Adult Bronze (preliminary), Adult Silver (Junior Bronze), Adult Gold (Senior Bronze), Masters Novice (Junior Silver), Masters Junior (Senior Silver) and Masters Senior (Gold) Due to the small number of skaters at the Masters level, Masters Skaters usually get grouped together in competition. Interpretive skating starts in Pre-Introductory, Introductory, Bronze, Silver and Gold. Dance has Preliminary, Junior Bronze, Senior Bronze, Junior Silver, Senior Silver, Gold and Diamond levels in compulsory dances. Currently Freedance is an open event. Pairs is also an open event due to low enrollments.

Some Canadian adult skaters compete in the US and/or overseas; Germany, France, Russia, Switzerland and Estonia.

International Competitions

There are also some other lists that are kept of the upcoming all adult competitions

Inter-club
Several clubs host annual adult-only competitions attended by skaters from several countries.  These competitions use similar levels and age ranges as those used in the U.S.  They include: 

The French Cup is a non-qualifying event, open to international skaters. The first competition took place in Le Havre, then Bordeaux, and Limoges. In 2010, it will take place in Besançon.

ISU
The International Skating Union held the first ISU International Adult Figure Skating Competition in Oberstdorf, Germany June 10–12, 2005.  The ISU event has slightly different age ranges than used in the other adult-only competitions.  The minimum age is 28 and the maximum age is 71, new class was introduced for skaters over 71.

List of ISU Adult Competitions with links to results

References

Figure skating

pl:Łyżwiarstwo figurowe#Adult Skating